Kadi Polli (born 16 September 1973 in Tallinn) is an Estonian art historian, curator an teacher.

2000-2013 she was the head of Kadriorg Art Museum. Since 2016 she is the head of Kumu Museum.

In 2008 she was awarded with the Order of Orange-Nassau (Holland).

References

Living people
1973 births
Estonian scientists
Estonian women scientists
Estonian art historians
Estonian women historians
Estonian Academy of Arts alumni
University of Tartu alumni
Academic staff of the University of Tartu
People from Tallinn